Femina is an album by John Zorn recorded in New York City in December 2008 and released on the Tzadik label in October 2009. The album is a tribute to the artistic creativity of women.

Reception

Allmusic said  "The music is among Zorn's most immediately engaging. It still consists of the juxtaposition of brief, sometimes jarringly disjunct musical ideas that has been a characteristic of much of his work, but while there are still some grindingly dissonant sections, the tone is predominantly lyrical... Femina is an album that reveals yet another facet of the composer's multifarious creative personality and is one that could attract new listeners to his work. Highly recommended". All About Jazz stated "The lyrical 35-minute piece lurches briskly from one mood to the next, vacillating from wispy introspective glissandos and airy impressionistic swells to concise thickets of caterwauling frenzy... In terms of aesthetics, Femina hearkens back to Zorn's early jump-cut style of writing and composing, bolstered by his current fascination with conventionally tuneful melodies and harmonies".

Track listing
All compositions by John Zorn
 "Femina Part 1" - 11:42   
 "Femina Part 2" - 10:11   
 "Femina Part 3" - 10:15   
 "Femina Part 4" - 3:16

Personnel
Jennifer Choi - violin
Sylvie Courvoisier - piano 
Carol Emanuel - harp
Okkyung Lee - cello
Ikue Mori - electronics 
Shayna Dunkelman - percussion 
Laurie Anderson - narration

Production
Marc Urselli - engineer, audio mixer
John Zorn and Kazunori Sugiyama – producers

References

2009 albums
John Zorn albums
Albums produced by John Zorn
Tzadik Records albums